Derek Stanley Savage (6 March 1917 – 14 October 2007) was a pacifist poet and critic. He was General Secretary of the Anglican Pacifist Fellowship, 1960–62.

Life
Savage was born in Essex and brought up in Cheshunt. He went to Hertford Grammar School and the Latymer School, Edmonton and then a commercial college. He became a convinced Christian Pacifist.

In 1938 he married Constance Kiernan. They had six children.

In the Second World War a tribunal accepted his conscientious objection to conscription. In a letter written in 1942, he informed George Orwell that Hitler required "not condemnation, but understanding".

In 1947 the family moved to Cornwall, initially to a dilapidated cottage in the Heligan Woods and then into the village of Mevagissey. Savage died in 2007, aged 90.

Writing and literary activities
According to Trevor Tolley, Derek Savage was associated with the following "leftist" writers in the 1940s: George Woodcock, Alex Comfort, J. F. Hendry, Norman McCaig, Derek Stanford. In Cornwall his associates included Louis Adeane, Dick Kitto, Mary Lee Settle, W. S. Graham, Nessie Dunsmuir, Frank Baker, Lionel Miskin and Bernie Moss.

He contributed many articles, reviews and poems to magazines such as Twentieth Century Verse, Life and letters today and The Phoenix, of which he became European Editor, in succession to Henry Miller. From Mevagissey he contributed many book reviews for The Spectator and Time and Tide.

His 1944 book The Personal Principle: Studies in modern poetry gave his strong views on contemporary poetry.

His controversial critical book The Withered Branch (1950) attacked the twentieth-century novels of Ernest Hemingway, E. M. Forster, Virginia Woolf, Margiad Evans, Aldous Huxley and James Joyce.

His last book of poetry, Winter offering: selected poems 1934–1953, was issued by the Leavisite Brynmill Press in 1990.

Publications

Books

  The Autumn World. [Poems. With a black and white portrait by Richard Seddon], Fortune Press, 1939
  Don Quixote, and other poems, London, Right review, 1939.
  A Time to mourn. Poems, 1934–1943. London, Routledge (New Poets series. no. 12). 1943
  The Personal Principle: Studies in modern poetry, London, Routledge, 1944.
  Hamlet & the Pirates: An exercise in literary detection,  London,  Eyre & Spottiswoode, 1950
  The Withered Branch: Six studies in the modern novel. London,  Eyre & Spottiswoode, 1950.
  The cottager's companion, London, Peter Davies, 1975.  and paperback edition, Mayflower, 1980. .
  Self-Sufficient Country Living, New York, St Martins Press, 1978,  (US edition of The Cottager's companion).
  And also much cattle : scenario for four voices, London  Brentham Press, 1975.  and, 1993 Harleston : Brynmill Press. . (Broadcast on the BBC Third Programme on 4 November 1956 ).
  Winter offering : selected poems 1934–1953, Gringley-on-the-Hill, S. Yorks. : Brynmill, c1990. . Edition of 190 copies.

Contributions to books and magazines

  Now Magazine, Autumn 1940 – Tribunal Statement 
  "Testament of a Conscientious Objector".  In: Simmons, Clifford, The Objectors, Isle of Man, Times Press, 1965. pp. 82–122.

Lyrics of musical works by John Douglas Turner
  Dirtying My Thing, c 1970
  Your Mother Thinks I’m a Hoodlum, c 1970

References
Guardian obituary of Derek Savage by Alison Oldham, with personal comment by Stephen Pike: The Guardian, 21 November 2007, available online.

1917 births
2007 deaths
English Christian pacifists
Anglican pacifists
British conscientious objectors
English literary critics
Literary critics of English
People from Cheshunt